The Delhi Open (formerly known as ONGC–GAIL Delhi Open) is a professional tennis tournament played on outdoor hard courts. It is currently part of the ATP Challenger Tour and the ITF Women's Circuit. Since 2014, it has been held annually at the R.K. Khanna Tennis Complex in New Delhi, India.

Past finals

Men's singles

Men's doubles

Women's singles

Women's doubles

References 

ATP Challenger Tour
ITF Women's World Tennis Tour
Hard court tennis tournaments
Tennis tournaments in India
Sport in New Delhi
Oil and Natural Gas Corporation
Recurring sporting events established in 2014